Stirling in Stirlingshire was a royal burgh that returned one commissioner to the Parliament of Scotland and to the Convention of Estates.

The Parliament of Scotland ceased to exist with the Act of Union 1707, and the commissioner for Stirling, John Erskine, was one of those co-opted to represent Scotland in the first Parliament of Great Britain. From the 1708 general election Culross, Dunfermline, Inverkeithing, Stirling and Queensferry comprised the Stirling district of burghs, electing one Member of Parliament between them.

List of burgh commissioners

 1474: James Shaw of Sauchie
 1572 convention: James Shaw
 1612: John Sherar
 1612, 1617 convention, 1617: John Williamson, town clerk  
 1621: Duncan Paterson  
 1625 convention: John Cowan  
 1628–33, 1630 convention, 1639–41, 1643–44, 1644–46, 1648: Thomas Bruce, provost 
 1646–47, 1648–51: John Shorte, sometime provost
 1651: John Cowan  
 1661–63, 1665 convention: Duncan Nairn, provost 
 1667 convention: James Steinston 
 1669–74: James Stevenson, provost 
 1678 convention, 1681–82: Robert Russell, provost 
 1685–86: John McCulloch, provost 
 1689 convention, 1689–90: Hugh Kennedy of Schelloch (died c.1690)
 1693–95: John Dick (expelled 1695 for menaces) 
 1696–97: Patrick Thompson, treasurer of Edinburgh (died 1698)
 1697–1702: Francis Napier of Craigannet, provost 
 1702–07: John Erskine

See also
 List of constituencies in the Parliament of Scotland at the time of the Union

References

Burghs represented in the Parliament of Scotland (to 1707)
Constituencies disestablished in 1707
History of Stirling (council area)
Politics of Stirling (council area)
1707 disestablishments in Scotland
Stirling (city)